Freedom Union can refer to:

Freedom Union – Democratic Union, Czech republic
 (Frælsisfylkingin)
Freedom Union (Poland)